Psaroxantha calligenes is a moth of the family Oecophoridae. It is found in Australia, including Tasmania.

References 

Oecophorinae